Hollingen is a village in Møre og Romsdal county, Norway. The village is mostly in Aukra Municipality, but about 1/3rd of the village area lies to the north of the municipal border inside Hustadvika Municipality. The village is mostly located on the small part of Aukra that is located on the mainland (most of the municipality is located on the island of Gossa). The village has ferry service across the Julsundet strait to the village of Aukrasanden on Gossa.

About  of the village lies in Aukra Municipality and the remaining  lies in Hustadvika Municipality. There are 761 residents of the village in Aukra and the remaining 402 residents live in Hustadvika.

References

Aukra
Hustadvika (municipality)
Villages in Møre og Romsdal